Kenneth Roskie (November 29, 1920 – August 18, 1986) was a player in the National Football League. He was drafted by the Green Bay Packers in the thirty-second round of the 1943 NFL Draft. Later he went on to play for the San Francisco 49ers of the All-America Football Conference before splitting the 1948 NFL season between the Packers and the Detroit Lions.

Roskie later became a coach, including at Washington from 1951 to 1953.

References

1920 births
1985 deaths
American football fullbacks
Detroit Lions players
Great Lakes Navy Bluejackets football players
Green Bay Packers players
San Francisco 49ers (AAFC) players
South Carolina Gamecocks football players
Washington Huskies football coaches
Sportspeople from Rockford, Illinois
Players of American football from Illinois
San Francisco 49ers players